Abdulrahman Al-Kuhaili (born October 20, 1985) is a Saudi football player who plays as a midfielder.

References

1985 births
Living people
Saudi Arabian footballers
Al-Ansar FC (Medina) players
Saudi First Division League players
Saudi Professional League players
Saudi Second Division players
Association football midfielders